Tiana, Tìana in Sardinian language, is a comune (municipality) in the Province of Nuoro in the Italian region Sardinia, located in a valley on the slopes of Gennargentu mountain in the Ollolai Barbagia, about  north of Cagliari and about  southwest of Nuoro.

Tiana borders the following municipalities: Austis, Desulo, Ovodda, Sorgono, Teti, Tonara.

Geography
The village is located about 600 meters above sea level. The peaks which frame it exceed 1000 m in altitude and constitute the last outposts of the Gennargentu mountain range. The highest point of the territory is Bruncu Muncinale to 1267 meters above sea level. 
The village is surrounded by a charming verdant landscape, covered by a thick mantle of ilex and cork trees, chestnut and walnut trees. 
Tiana is included in the National Park of the Bay of Orosei and Gennargentu.

History
Tiana area has been settled since Neolithic times as evidenced by the presence of Domus de Janas in the Mancosu aerea, and some remains of Nuraghic settlements in Sa Piraera and Tudulo areas.

Demographic evolution

References

Cities and towns in Sardinia